Take Me Higher is a studio album by American singer Diana Ross.

Take Me Higher  may also refer to:

"Take Me Higher" (song), a 1995 single by Diana Ross
"Take Me Higher", song by Inna
"Take Me Higher!!", song by Band-Maid from Just Bring It
"Take Me Higher", single by Robin Thicke
"Take Me Higher", song by Jars of Clay from the album Good Monsters

See also
 Takes Me Higher, song by J. Williams
 Take Me High, a 1973 British film starring Cliff Richard
 Taking Me Higher (disambiguation)